Yorkshire pudding is a baked pudding made from a batter of eggs, flour, and milk or water. A common British side dish, it is a versatile food that can be served in numerous ways depending on its ingredients, size, and the accompanying components of the meal. As a first course, it can be served with onion gravy. For a main course, it may be served with meat and gravy, and is part of the traditional Sunday roast, but can also be filled with foods such as bangers and mash to make a meal. Sausages can be added to make toad in the hole. The 18th-century cookery writer Hannah Glasse was the first to use the term "Yorkshire pudding" in print.

Yorkshire puddings are similar to Dutch baby pancakes, and to popovers, an American light roll made from an egg batter.

History

When wheat flour began to come into common use for making cakes and puddings, cooks in northern England (Yorkshire) devised a means of making use of the fat that dropped into the dripping pan to cook a batter pudding while the meat roasted. In 1737, a recipe for "a dripping pudding" was published in Sir Alexander William George Cassey's book The Whole Duty of a Woman:

Similar instructions were published during 1747 in the book The Art of Cookery made Plain and Easy by Hannah Glasse, with the name 'Yorkshire pudding'. It was she who renamed the original version, known as Dripping Pudding, which had been cooked in England for centuries, although these puddings were much flatter than the puffy versions made in modern times. William Sitwell suggests that the pudding got the name 'Yorkshire' due to the region's association with coal and the higher temperatures this produced which helped to make the batter crisper.

Originally, the Yorkshire pudding was served as a first course with thick gravy to dull the appetite with the low-cost ingredients so that the diners would not eat so much of the more expensive meat in the next course. Because the rich gravy from the roast meat drippings was used with the first course, the main meat and vegetable course was often served with a parsley or white sauce. In poorer households, the pudding was often served as the only course. Using dripping, a simple meal was made with flour, eggs and milk. This was traditionally eaten with a gravy or sauce, to moisten the pudding.

The Yorkshire pudding is meant to rise.

In a 2012 poll conducted by T-Mobile UK, the Yorkshire pudding was ranked tenth in a list of things people love about Britain.

Baking method
Yorkshire pudding is baked by pouring a batter made from milk, flour and eggs into oiled and preheated baking pans (ramekins or muffin tins in the case of miniature puddings). A basic formula uses 200ml flour and 200ml milk with four eggs (also 200ml). Water produces a lighter, crisper, but less sweet pudding than using milk. They can also be baked in cast-iron frying pans or similar. A 1926 recipe involves covering the pudding with greaseproof paper to steam it and then serving it with jam, butter and sugar.

Yorkshire Pudding Day
National Yorkshire Pudding Day has been celebrated on the first Sunday in February in Britain since 2007. It is celebrated on 13 October in the United States.

References

External links

British puddings
English cuisine
Savory puddings